The given name Jacinta is the feminine form of old European masculine name known across the West as
 Jácint in Hungarian language 
 Jacenty in Polish 
 Jacinto in Spanish and Portuguese. 

Variants in English or other languages include Hyacinth, Hyacintha, Jacinda, Jacintha, Jacinthe, Jacynthe, Jesinta, Jaxine or Giacinta.

As an English name, the name is mostly used in the New Zealand and Australia.

People
Jacinda
Jacinda Ardern, Prime Minister of New Zealand
Jacinda Barrett, Australian actress

Jacinta
Jacinta Allan, Australian politician
Jacinta Coleman (1974–2017), New Zealand road cyclist
Jacinta John, Australian actress, producer and director
Jacinta Monroe (born 1988), American professional women's basketball player
Jacinta Stapleton, Australian actress
Jacinta Brondgeest, Australian dance-pop singer
Jacinta Marto, one of three Portuguese shepherd children who claimed to witness the apparitions of Our Lady of Fátima
Jacinta Tynan (born 1969), Australian news presenter and journalist
 Jacinta Ruru New Zealand Maori professor of law.

Jacinthe
 Jacinthe Bouchard, Canadian animal behaviorist and trainer
 Jacinthe Laguë, Canadian actress
 Jacinthe Larivière (born 1981), Canadian skater
 Jacinthe Pineau (born 1974), Canadian swimmer
 Jacinthe Taillon (born 1977), Canadian synchronized swimmer

Jacynthe
 Jacynthe Carrier, Canadian visual artist
 Jacynthe Millette-Bilodeau, Canadian pop singer
 Jacynthe Poirier, Canadian Olympic fencer

Giacinta
Giacinta Marescotti, Italian saint
Giacinta 'Jinx' Johnson, fictional James Bond character

Other
Giacinta ed Ernesto, an opera by Julius Benedict
Giacinta, a novel by Luigi Capuana
 Jacinta, an oil well drilled by Desire Petroleum in the southern part of the North Falkland Basin
 Jacinta (FD159), a stern-fishing trawler ship launched in 1972

See also
Jacinda

References

Given names
Feminine given names
English feminine given names
Given names derived from plants or flowers